Antonio Ullo (born 7 January 1963) is a former Italian sprinter who specialized in the 60 metres.

Biography
Antonio Ullo won four medals at the International athletics competitions, two of these with the national relay team, and he was 4th with the relay team at 1984 Summer Olympics. He has 30 caps in national team from 1983 to 1991. His personal best 100 metres time is 10.36 seconds, achieved in the heats of the 1984 Olympics. His personal best 200 metres time is 20.99 seconds, achieved in May 1987 in Potenza.

Achievements

See also
 Italy national relay team

References

External links
 

1963 births
Living people
Italian male sprinters
Athletes (track and field) at the 1984 Summer Olympics
Olympic athletes of Italy
People from Milazzo
Sportspeople from the Province of Messina
Italian Athletics Championships winners
Athletics competitors of Fiamme Gialle